All About Yves, also known as Yves, is a 2019 French comedy film directed by Benoît Forgeard. It was screened in the Directors' Fortnight section at the 2019 Cannes Film Festival.

Cast
 Doria Tillier as So Balotelli
 William Lebghil as Jérem Roudet
 Antoine Gouy as Yves (voice)
 Philippe Katerine
 Alka Balbir
 Darius as Roger Phila

Plot
A fictitious French company, Digital Cool, has developed an advanced refrigerator with near AI capability. It places two beta models with potential users to learn the results of their interactions with the apparatus. A French couple (played by Balbir and Katerine) host one of the units, named Vincent; a single French man, Jerem, receives the other, named Yves.

Jerem is a wannabe music developer, currently working out of his garage, and basically going nowhere careerwise. He is initially repelled by the refrigerator as it criticizes his diet, opines on current events, and physically blocks Jerem from his unhealthy eating habits. But when the company sends a statistician (So) to monitor his interactions with the unit, his attitude changes as he tries to win her attention and affection.

The three-way interaction between the two humans and the almost-human appliance is explored in the remainder of the film. Yves is able to transform rap lyrics into Auto-Tuned online success, while giving dating tips to Jerem. It eventually leads to a rap showdown, followed by an absurd three-way.

References

External links
 

2019 films
2019 comedy films
2010s French-language films
French comedy films
2010s French films